Qaleh (also Romanized as Qal‘eh; also known as Qal‘eh Pīrmoḩammadī) is a village in Dalfard Rural District, Sarduiyeh District, Jiroft County, Kerman Province, Iran. At the 2006 census, its population was 126, in 27 families.

References 

Populated places in Jiroft County